Joseph Doyle was the brother-in-law of Charlie Byrne and part of the original ownership team of what became the Brooklyn Dodgers.

External links
Brooklyn history
120 Years of Dodgers history

Baseball executives
Brooklyn Dodgers
Year of birth missing
Year of death missing